Inosuke Hazama (14 November 1895 – 16 August 1977) was a Japanese painter. His work was part of the painting event in the art competition at the 1936 Summer Olympics.

References

1895 births
1977 deaths
20th-century Japanese painters
Japanese painters
Olympic competitors in art competitions
People from Tokyo